David Brian Ashley (born January 5, 1951) was the eighth president of the University of Nevada, Las Vegas, appointed to the position on July 1, 2006 and relieved of his duties by the Board of Regents on July 10, 2009.

Ashley attended MIT, becoming a member of the Sigma Chi fraternity, and graduated in 1973. His bachelor's degree and master's degree, also of MIT, are both in civil engineering; he has a second master's degree and a doctorate from Stanford University. He served as the founding executive vice chancellor and provost at the University of California, Merced starting in 2001 and was the dean of the College of Engineering at the Ohio State University.

Ashley's professional experiences as a civil engineer and as an expert in construction management include work on major projects around the globe. He has been called upon to work on the expansion of the Panama Canal and the San Francisco-Oakland Bay Bridge.

In 2000, Ashley received an honorary doctorate from the Chalmers University in Sweden for his academic contributions.

On July 10, 2009, Ashley was relieved of his duties as President of UNLV by the Board of Regents of the Nevada System of Higher Education, effective immediately. Executive Vice President and Provost Neal Smatresk immediately became the Acting President of UNLV. Ashley retains his  position as a tenured professor of Civil Engineering. He will continue to receive his presidential salary of $242,424 until his contract expires.

References

External links
 UNLV President's site

1951 births
Living people
Ohio State University faculty
Presidents of the University of Nevada, Las Vegas
MIT School of Engineering alumni
Stanford University alumni